Wörthersee Piraten is a professional basketball club based in Klagenfurt am Wörthersee, Austria. The team played in the ÖBL for the last time in 2009–10. In club history the Piraten reached the ÖBL Finals once, in 2001 and were Cup finalists twice (1998 and 2002).

External links
Team profile at eurobasket.com
Official website 

Basketball teams in Austria
Basketball teams established in 1978